Mitter is a surname. Notable people with the surname include:

 Adam Mitter (born 1993), English footballer
 Gerhard Mitter (1935–1969), German racing driver
 Gobindram Mitter (fl. 18th century), one of the earliest Indian officials under the British rule
 Rana Mitter (born 1969), historian of modern China at Oxford University
 Sanjoy K. Mitter (born 1933), engineering professor and control theorist
 Siddheshwar Mitter (1865–1912), civilian employed in the Indian Foreign Department

Fictional
 Pradosh C. Mitter aka Feluda - a fictional famous Bengali private investigator, created by Satyajit Ray

See also
 Ghakka Mitter, a village situated two kilometers east of Wazirabad city, Pakistan

German-language surnames